The Online Safety Bill is a proposed Act of the Parliament of the United Kingdom intended to improve internet safety, published as a draft on 12 May 2021. Following the earlier 2019 Online Harms White Paper, the Bill gives the relevant Secretary of State the power, subject to Parliamentary approval, to designate and address a wide range of potentially harmful content, which may include online trolling, illegal pornography and underage access to legal pornography, and some forms of internet fraud.

The Bill would create a new duty of care for online platforms towards their users, requiring them to take action against both illegal and legal but harmful content. Platforms failing this duty would be liable to fines of up to £18 million or 10% of their annual turnover, whichever is higher. It  would also empower Ofcom to block access to particular websites. Additionally, the Bill would oblige large social media platforms not to remove, and to preserve access to, journalistic or "democratically important" content such as user comments on political parties and issues.

The bill has been heavily criticised for its proposals to restrain the publication of "lawful but harmful" speech, effectively creating a new form of censorship of otherwise legal speech. As a result, in November 2022, measures that were intended to force big technology platforms to take down "legal but harmful" materials were removed from the Online Safety Bill. Instead, tech platforms will be obliged to introduce systems that will allow the users to better filter out the harmful content they don't want to see.However, the bill still grants significant powers to the Secretary of State to give tactical guidance to OFCOM, the media regulator, on the exercise of its functions, which includes the power to direct OFCOM as to the content of codes of practice. This has raised concerns about the government's unjustified intrusion in decisions that are about the regulation of speech and the unnecessary levels of interference and threats to the independence of OFCOM. The bill has been criticized for expanding unconstrained emergency-like powers that would allow the Secretary of State to direct OFCOM and even target individual companies, which could undermine OFCOM's authority and independence. The powers in the bill effectively create a new form of censorship of otherwise legal speech.

Provisions

Scope
Within the scope of the Bill is any "user-to-user service".  This is defined as an internet service by means of which content that is generated by a user of the service, or uploaded to or shared on the service by a user of the service, may be read, viewed, heard or otherwise experienced ("encountered") by another user, or other users. Content includes written material or messages, oral communications, photographs, videos, visual images, music and data of any description.

The duty of care applies globally to services with a significant number of United Kingdom users, or which target UK users, or those which are capable of being used in the United Kingdom where there are reasonable grounds to believe that there is a material risk of significant harm.

Duties
The Duty of Care refers to a number of specific duties to all services within scope:

 The illegal content risk assessment duty  
 The illegal content duties
 The duty about rights to freedom of expression and privacy
 The duties about reporting and redress 
 The record-keeping and review duties

For services 'likely to be accessed by children', adopting the same scope as the Age Appropriate Design Code, two additional duties are imposed:

 The children's risk assessment duties 
 The duties to protect children’s online safety

For Category 1 services, which will be defined in secondary legislation but are limited to the largest global platforms, there are four further new duties:

 The adults' risk assessment duties 
 The duties to protect adults’ online safety
 The duties to protect content of democratic importance 
 The duties to protect journalistic content

Enforcement
The Bill would empower Ofcom, the national communications regulator, to block access to particular user-to-user services or search engines from the United Kingdom, including through interventions by internet access providers and app stores.  The regulator will also be able to impose, through "service restriction orders", requirements on ancillary services which facilitate the provision of the regulated services.  The Bill lists in Section 92 as examples (i) services which enable funds to be transferred, (ii) search engines which generate search results displaying or promoting content and (iii) services which facilitate the display of advertising on a regulated service (for example, an ad server or an ad network). Ofcom must apply to a court for both Access Restriction and Service Restriction Orders. Clause 39 of the Bill also gives the Secretary of State the power to direct OFCOM to modify a draft code of practice for online safety if deemed necessary for reasons of public policy, national security or public safety. OFCOM must comply with the direction and submit a revised draft to the Secretary of State. The Secretary of State may give OFCOM further directions to modify the draft, and once satisfied, must lay the modified draft before Parliament. However, the Secretary of State can remove or obscure information before laying the review statement before Parliament.

Limitations
The Bill has provisions to impose legal requirements ensuring that content removals do not arbitrarily remove or infringe access to what it defines as journalistic content. Large social networks would be required to protect "democratically important" content, such as user-submitted posts supporting or opposing particular political parties or policies. The government stated that news publishers' own websites, as well as reader comments on such websites, are not within the intended scope of the law.

Age verification for online pornography
Clause 131 of the draft bill would repeal part 3 of the Digital Economy Act 2017, which demands mandatory age verification to access online pornography but was subsequently not enforced by the government.  The draft bill will include within scope any pornographic site which has functionality to allow for user-to-user services, but those which do not have this functionality, or choose to remove it, would not be in scope based on the draft published by the government.

Addressing the House of Commons DCMS Select Committee, the Secretary of State, Oliver Dowden, confirmed he would be happy to consider a proposal during pre-legislative scrutiny of the Bill by a joint committee of both Houses of Parliament to extend the scope of the Bill to all commercial pornographic websites. The draft Bill addresses the major concern expressed by campaigners such as the Open Rights Group about the risk to user privacy with the Digital Economy Act's requirement for age verification by creating, on services within scope of the legislation, "A duty to have regard to the importance of... protecting users from unwarranted infringements of privacy, when deciding on, and implementing, safety policies and procedures."

In February 2022 the Digital Economy Minister, Chris Philp, announced that the bill would be amended to bring commercial pornographic websites within its scope.

Legislative process and timetable
The draft bill will be subject to pre-legislative scrutiny by a joint committee of Members of the House of Commons and peers from the House of Lords.  The Opposition Spokesperson, Lord Ponsonby of Shulbrede, in the House of Lords speculated at the timetable: "My understanding is that we now have a timeline for the online harms Bill, with pre-legislative scrutiny expected immediately after the Queen’s Speech—before the Summer Recess—and that Second Reading would be expected after the Summer Recess." But the Minister replying refused to pre-empt the Queen's Speech by confirming this.

In early February 2022, ministers planned to add to their existing proposal several criminal offences against those who send death threats online or deliberately share dangerous disinformation about fake Covid cures. Other new offences, such as revenge porn, posts advertising people-smuggling, and messages encouraging people to commit suicide, would fall under the responsibilities of online platforms like Facebook and Twitter to tackle.

References

External links
 Draft Online Safety Bill
 Joint Committee on the Draft Online Safety Bill

Proposed laws of the United Kingdom
Mass media regulation
Social media
Internet censorship in the United Kingdom
United Kingdom tort law